Inka Laqaya (Aymara Inka Inca, laqaya ruins of a building, "Inca ruin", Hispanicized spelling Inca Lacaya) is a  mountain in the Bolivian Andes. It lies in the La Paz Department, Inquisivi Province, in the north of the Ichoca Municipality. Inka Laqaya is situated at the river Millu Juqhu which originates near the mountain. It flows to the south-east.

References 

Mountains of La Paz Department (Bolivia)